Maynes may refer to:

Ben Jacques-Maynes (born 1978), American road bicycle racing cyclist from Watsonville, California
Dan Maynes-Aminzade (aka Monzy) is a Nerdcore hip-hop artist and software engineer at Google
Seaghan Maynes (1914–1998), Reuters correspondent, covered the Invasion of Normandy, the Reconstruction of Germany, and the 1948 Arab Israeli War